Ixodes petauristae is a hard-bodied tick of the genus Ixodes. It is found in India and Sri Lanka. Adults parasitize various smaller mammals such as Ratufa indica, Funambulus tristriatus, Macaca radiata, Petaurista sp. and mice. It is a potential vector of Kyasanur Forest disease virus,

References

External links
Transovarial transmission of Kyasanur Forest Disease virus by Ixodes petauristae.
REARING OF IXODES PETAURISTAE WARBURTON, 1933, IN LABORATORY.
Description of the Nymph and Larva of Ixodes Petauristae Warburton, 1933
On Five New Species of Ticks (Arachnida Ixodoidea): Ixodes Petauristae, I. ampullaceus, Dermacentob imitans, Amblyomma laticaudae and Aponomma draconis, with Notes on Three Previously Described Species, Ornithodorus franchinii Tonelli-Rondelli, Haemaphysalis Cooleyi Bedford and Rhipicephalus maculatus Neumann

petauristae
Animals described in 1933